KoLiber is a Polish political association. It has a parliamentary representation in the Sejm and Senate. KoLiber's ideology is conservative liberalism, capitalism, conservatism, and minarchism.

Leaders
 Stanisław Wojtera (1999 – 2000)
 Jacek Szafader (2000 – 2001)
 Przemysław Wipler (2001)
 Stanisław Wojtera (2001 – 2002)
 Adam Wojtasiewicz (2002 – 2003)
 Marcin Kościukiewicz (2003 – 2004)
 Paweł Podsiedlik (2004 – 2005)
 Magdalena Murawska (2005 – 2006)
 Jacek Spendel (2006 – 2007)
 Karol Wyszyński (2007 – 2008)
 Marek Morawiak (2008 – 2009)
 Marcin Kamiński (2009 – 2011)
 Seweryn Szwarocki (2011 – 2012)
 Jakub Kulesza (2012 – 2013)
 Marcin Bagiński (2013 – 2014)
 Adam Kondrakiewicz (2014 – 2014)
 Tomasz Pułról (2014 – 2015)
 Kamil Rybikowski (2015 – 2016)
 Mikołaj Pisarski (2016 – 2017)
 Robert Iwanicki (2017 – 2018)
 Miłosz Jabłoński (2018 – 2019)
 Justyna Poświatowska (2019 – 2019)
 Karol Handzel (2019 – )

Honorary members
 Roman Kluska
 Jeremi Mordasewicz
 Jan Pospieszalski
 Bronisław Wildstein
 Jan Winiecki
 Mart Laar
 Rafał Ziemkiewicz
 Robert Gwiazdowski
 Maciej Rybiński
 Stanisław Michalkiewicz
 Jaroslav Romanchuk

External links

2000 establishments in Poland
Conservative liberal parties
Conservative parties in Poland
Liberal parties in Poland
Minarchism
Political parties established in 2000
Political parties in Poland